Siedliska  is a village in the administrative district of Gmina Zębowice, within Olesno County, Opole Voivodeship, in south-western Poland.

Before 1945 the city was called "'Frei-Pipa'". After the war the German were expelled and killed, yet there is still a German minority in this city.

Since 2008 the some Polish cities have, beside their polish name, the old original German name as well. One of those cities is Siedliska. But in this case it was not used the old name Frei-Pipa but a new German sounding name "Schiedlisk" which has no connection to the original old German name.

References

Siedliska